Egypt competed at the World Games 2017  in Wroclaw, Poland, from 20 July 2017 to 30 July 2017.

Competitors

Archery

Egypt has qualified at the 2017 World Games:

Women's Individual Compound - 1 quota (Hala Elgibily)

Karate

Sumo

References 

Nations at the 2017 World Games
2017 in Egyptian sport
2017